Hot Bird 13B, known as Hot Bird 8 prior to 2012, is a geostationary communications satellite. Operated by Eutelsat, it provides direct-to-home (DTH) broadcasting services from geostationary orbit as part of Eutelsat's Hot Bird constellation at a longitude of 13° East.

Satellite description 
Eutelsat and EADS Astrium announced in September 2003 the signature of a contract for the construction the Hot Bird 8 broadcast satellite. Hot Bird 8 was constructed by EADS Astrium, and is based on the Eurostar-3000 satellite bus. The spacecraft has 64 Ku-band transponders, broadcasting satellite television and radio to Europe, North Africa, and the Middle East.

Launch 
Hot Bird 8, as it was then named, was launched by a Proton-M launch vehicle with a Briz-M upper stage. The launch took place from Site 200/39 at the Baikonur Cosmodrome, at 21:48:00 UTC on 4 August 2006  with spacecraft separation occurring at 06:59:20 UTC on 5 August 2006. The launch was conducted by International Launch Services. The spacecraft was deployed into geosynchronous transfer orbit, raising itself to its operational geostationary position at 13° East by means of its apogee motor. The spacecraft is co-located with Hot Bird 13C and Hot Bird 13D.

References

External links 
 Hot Bird 13B at the European Telecommunications Satellite Organization official website.
 Hot Bird 13B frequency chart on LyngSat

Spacecraft launched in 2006
Satellites using the Eurostar bus
Eutelsat satellites
Communications satellites in geostationary orbit
Spacecraft launched by Proton rockets